Armon Watts (born July 22, 1996) is an American football defensive tackle of the National Football League (NFL). He played college football at Arkansas.

Professional career

Minnesota Vikings
Watts was selected by the Minnesota Vikings in the sixth round (190th overall) of the 2019 NFL Draft.

On November 10, 2019, Watts combined for a sack of Cowboys quarterback Dak Prescott with teammate Everson Griffen in a 28-24 win on Sunday Night Football. It was his first career game. He was placed on injured reserve on December 31, 2019.

Watts was placed on the reserve/COVID-19 list by the Vikings on August 4, 2020, and was activated two days later.

Watts was waived by the Vikings on August 30, 2022.

Chicago Bears
On August 31, 2022, Watts was claimed by waivers by the Chicago Bears.

References

External links
Chicago Bears bio
Arkansas Razorbacks bio

1996 births
Living people
Players of American football from St. Louis
American football defensive tackles
Arkansas Razorbacks football players
Minnesota Vikings players
Chicago Bears players